Kimbel Gerald Clackson (born February 13, 1955) is a Canadian former professional ice hockey defenceman who played 106 games in the National Hockey League (NHL) and 271 games in the World Hockey Association (WHA). Clackson played for the Winnipeg Jets, Quebec Nordiques, Pittsburgh Penguins, and Indianapolis Racers. He currently holds the NHL record for most penalties in a single playoff game (8 - Apr 14, 1980 vs Boston).

Clackson's elder son, Matt, was drafted by the Philadelphia Flyers and played 270 games in the American Hockey League (AHL). Another son, Chris,  played in the AHL and the ECHL.

Career statistics

References

External links

1955 births
Canadian ice hockey defencemen
Flin Flon Bombers players
Ice hockey people from Saskatchewan
Indianapolis Racers players
Living people
Minnesota Fighting Saints draft picks
Pittsburgh Penguins draft picks
Pittsburgh Penguins players
Quebec Nordiques players
Sportspeople from Saskatoon
Victoria Cougars (WHL) players
Winnipeg Jets (WHA) players